In Greek mythology, Drymo or Drimo may refer to two different characters:

 Drymo or Drimo, was one of the 50 Nereids, sea-nymph daughters of the 'Old Man of the Sea' Nereus and the Oceanid Doris. She was one of the nymphs in the train of Cyrene. Drymo was described to have bright, waving locks of hair and a slender pale neck.
 Drimo, one of the Alcyonides, daughters of the giant Alcyoneus. She was the sister of Alcippe, Anthe, Asteria, Methone, Pallene and Phthonia (Phosthonia or Chthonia). When their father Alcyoneus was slain by Heracles, these girls threw themselves into the sea from Kanastraion, which is the peak of Pellene. They were then transformed into halcyons (kingfishers) by the goddess Amphitrite.

Notes

References 

 Gaius Julius Hyginus, Fabulae from The Myths of Hyginus translated and edited by Mary Grant. University of Kansas Publications in Humanistic Studies. Online version at the Topos Text Project.
Publius Vergilius Maro, Bucolics, Aeneid, and Georgics of Vergil. J. B. Greenough. Boston. Ginn & Co. 1900. Online version at the Perseus Digital Library.
 Suida, Suda Encyclopedia translated by Ross Scaife, David Whitehead, William Hutton, Catharine Roth, Jennifer Benedict, Gregory Hays, Malcolm Heath Sean M. Redmond, Nicholas Fincher, Patrick Rourke, Elizabeth Vandiver, Raphael Finkel, Frederick Williams, Carl Widstrand, Robert Dyer, Joseph L. Rife, Oliver Phillips and many others. Online version at the Topos Text Project.

Nereids
Mythological Thracian women
Greek mythology of Thrace